Monomorium hospitum is a species of ant in the genus Monomorium. It is native to Singapore.

References

hospitum
Insects of Singapore
Hymenoptera of Asia
Insects described in 1916
Taxonomy articles created by Polbot